Miguel López de la Serna, O.F.M. (also Michele Lopez de la Sorra) (died 1490) was a Roman Catholic prelate who served as Bishop of Islas Canarias (1486–1490).

Biography
Miguel López de la Serna was ordained a priest in the Order of Friars Minor.
On 29 Mar 1486, he was appointed during the papacy of Pope Innocent VIII as Bishop of Islas Canarias. 
He served as Bishop of Islas Canarias until his death in 1490.

References

External links and additional sources
 (for Chronology of Bishops)
 (for Chronology of Bishops)

15th-century Roman Catholic bishops in the Kingdom of Aragon
Bishops appointed by Pope Innocent VIII
1490 deaths
Franciscan bishops